Steve Anthony Cook (born 19 April 1991) is an English professional footballer who plays as a defender for Nottingham Forest.

Club career

Brighton & Hove Albion
Born in Hastings, East Sussex, Cook made his first-team debut for Brighton & Hove Albion during the League Cup third round victory over Manchester City on 24 September 2008. He made his second substitute appearance for Brighton during a 2–1 FA Cup first round replay defeat against Hartlepool United on 18 November 2008.

On 23 December 2008, Cook joined Conference South team Havant & Waterlooville on loan for six-weeks. When this loan expired, he once again found himself involved in the Brighton first team, making his third substitute appearance for the club during the Football League Trophy Southern Final penalty shoot-out defeat to Luton Town.

Cook made his first league appearance for Brighton during a 4–0 home defeat to Crewe Alexandra on 28 February 2009.

He, along with fellow youth players Steve Brinkhurst and Josh Pelling, signed professional contracts with Brighton on 7 May 2009.

On 20 November 2009, Cook joined Conference South team Eastleigh on loan to gain first-team match experience. He was sent off on his debut in a 1–1 draw with Lewes in the third qualifying round of the FA Trophy on 21 November 2009.

On 16 September 2010, Cook once again went on loan, this time to Conference Premier side Eastbourne Borough where he spent a month. After making seven appearances and scoring once, Eastbourne were keen to extend the loan deal for the player, but were however unsuccessful as he later joined Conference Premier rivals Mansfield Town on a loan deal lasting until January 2011. Brighton manager Gus Poyet later revealed that he felt Cook would add another ingredient to his footballing education by spending time away from Sussex and that it would force him to "grow up".

Cook made his first appearance for Brighton in over two-and-a-half years during the League Cup game against Liverpool in September 2011.

AFC Bournemouth

Initial loan and League One
On 27 October 2011, Cook joined League One side AFC Bournemouth on loan. On 3 January 2012, Cook re-joined Bournemouth permanently for £150,000 signing a three-and-a-half-year deal, after making an initial 8 appearances during his loan spell. Cook made a further 18 appearances for the Cherries in the 2011/12 season, as the club finished 11th in League One.

The following season began poorly for Cook and the Cherries, with the club winning just 1 of their first 11 games, languishing bottom of the league, and parting ways with manager Paul Groves on 3 October. Cook appeared in just 8 of the first 20 league games this season, before finally putting together a run of starts for the side, beginning with a 2–1 win against Scunthorpe United on 8 December. Cook and Bournemouth then enjoyed a club-record setting run of 8 consecutive victories, culminating in a 3–1 home win against Carlisle United. Cook scored his first goal of the season in this game, which saw Bournemouth promoted to the Championship. Cook finished the season having made 38 appearances for the club in total across all competitions.

Championship & Promotion to the Premier League
Cook made a decent start to his first season in the Championship with Bournemouth, starting the first 20 league games of the season and being a consistent presence for the club. He scored his first ever Championship goal in a 5–2 home win against Millwall on 5 October. Cook scored his second goal of the season, and the only goal of the game, in a 0–1 away win against Barnsley on 22 March, and he then scored again in a 2–2 draw away to Ipswich on 21 April. Cook finished his first season-proper of Championship football having made 40 appearances for the club in all competitions, as Bournemouth recorded their highest ever league finish of 10th.

The 2014–15 season started well for Cook, playing in and keeping a clean sheet in the 0–4 opening day win away at Huddersfield Town. Cook went on to score in the games against Blackburn and Rotherham on 23 August and 13 September respectively. Bournemouth went on an impressive run of 14 games unbeaten, a period in which Cook played every single minute, beginning with a 1–2 away win at Bolton on 4 October and ending with a 1–2 home defeat to Norwich City on 10 January. Within this period Cook played in the Cherries 0–8 away win against Birmingham City; which is Bournemouth's highest league win in recorded history.

The Cherries would then go on another undefeated streak, which would last until the end of the season, starting with a 0–0 home draw against Blackburn. Cook scored his fourth goal of the season, a screamer against Fulham in a 1–5 away win that lifted the Cherries into first on goal difference, on 6 March. Cook started in and played the full 90 minutes in the pivotal home game against Bolton on 27 April. With the Cherries far superior goal difference to third placed Middlesbrough FC, a win in the penultimate game would all but confirm the club's promotion to the Premier League; Bournemouth went on to seal an impressive 3–0 win to do just that. Cook repeated the trick with the Cherries by playing the full 90 minutes once more in the final game of the season against Charlton, a 0–3 away win that secured not just the promotion, but the Championship title as well, with Watford failing to beat Sheffield Wednesday in their final game. Cook was ever-present in the 2014–15 season, playing in all 46 games and scoring 4 goals as Bournemouth won the Championship and were promoted to the Premier League.

Premier League years
On 4 December 2016, he scored to equalise and then created the winning goal as Bournemouth completed one of the comebacks of the season to beat Liverpool for the first time in their history 4–3 in a sensational Premier League game. He made his 300th appearance for the Cherries in February 2019.

Nottingham Forest
On 4 January 2022, Cook moved to Championship side Nottingham Forest on a two-and-a-half year contract for an undisclosed fee.

Personal life
On 23 June 2022, Cook was announced to have taken majority ownership of eleventh tier side Westfield, based just north of Cook's birthplace of Hastings.

Career statistics

Honours
AFC Bournemouth
Football League Championship: 2014–15

Nottingham Forest
EFL Championship play-offs: 2022

References

External links
Profile at the Nottingham Forest F.C. website

1991 births
Living people
Sportspeople from Hastings
English footballers
Association football defenders
Brighton & Hove Albion F.C. players
Havant & Waterlooville F.C. players
Eastleigh F.C. players
Eastbourne Borough F.C. players
Mansfield Town F.C. players
AFC Bournemouth players
Nottingham Forest F.C. players
English Football League players
National League (English football) players
Premier League players